Marina Sysoyeva (born 3 June 1959) is a retired high jumper from Frunze, Kirghiz SSR who represented the USSR.

Her greatest achievement was the fifth place at the 1980 Summer Olympics, jumping 1.91 metres. Two weeks before the competition, she had achieved a career best result of 1.93 metres.

References

External links
 

1959 births
Living people
Sportspeople from Bishkek
Kyrgyzstani female high jumpers
Soviet female high jumpers
Athletes (track and field) at the 1980 Summer Olympics
Olympic athletes of the Soviet Union